The AACTA Award for Best Hair and Makeup is an award presented by the Australian Academy of Cinema and Television Arts (AACTA), a non-profit organisation whose aim is to "identify, award, promote and celebrate Australia's greatest achievements in film and television." The award is presented at the annual AACTA Awards, which hand out accolades for achievements in feature film, television, documentaries and short films. The award was first introduced in 2016 for the 6th AACTA Awards.

Feature films, documentaries and television programs are eligible for Best Hair and Makeup. A minimum of two candidates may be nominated in this category. To be considered, the production must: be broadcast and theatrically released in Australia during the award's eligibility period (for television programs and feature films or feature-length documentaries, respectably); have been wholly created in Australia.

Kath Brown, Simon Joseph and Troy Follington received the inaugural award for their work on Cleverman.

Nominees and winners

References

External links
 Official website of the Australian Academy of Cinema and Television Arts

H
AACTA Award winners
Makeup awards
Hairdressing
Awards established in 2016